George Everard Hill (born 20 May 1942) is an Australian chef, educator, and author. Hill is one of seven living Black Hat Chefs in Australia and is a "2004 Pioneer" amongst Les Toques Blanches (lit. "The White Hats") Executive Chefs of Australia.

Career
George Hill's professional career has borne a range of industrial titles, including these: chef de partie, chef de cuisine, executive chef, cookery teacher, commercial cookery educational manager, hospitality consultant, and business owner-operator.

Hill started his cookery career in 1956 as an apprentice cook in the Cumberland Hotel London. In 1966, he immigrated to Australia and became an Australian citizen in 1979. His first job in Australia was as a chef at the Royal Automobile Club of Victoria (RACV) Club in Melbourne.  Following that, he was employed by the William Angliss Institute of TAFE in Melbourne as a commercial cookery teacher in 1971, where he eventually lead a teaching staff numbering more than thirty personnel in the foods department. Subsequently, Hill was promoted to one of the four program managers of the college.

In 1983, he received the Australian Foodservice Manufacturers Association Award, which is conferred to those "seen to have done the most for the Foodservice industry". 1994 saw Hill's induction into the National Association of Foodservice Equipment Suppliers Hall of Fame, where he was "acknowledged for contribution as an educator" within the hospitality industry. In 1986, Hill moved to the new Chisholm Institute in Victoria to head the Tourism and Hospitality Faculty.

Hill was the owner-operator of Rosehill Lodge, an externally rated five-star bed and breakfast for "foodies" which was twice acknowledged as a finalist in the 1999 and 2000 Victorian Tourism Awards.

Hill was awarded a Churchill Fellowship in 1988, and has coauthored the only technical book on the topic of margarine and butter sculpture. He was also Director of the World Championships in Commercial Cookery in Melbourne and represented Australia in the 1980 Culinary Olympics winning gold for Australia. He was appointed to represent Australia as a cookery judge in the first Worldskills 1983 and has internationally judged in New Zealand and Fiji.

In 2000, Hill was bestowed the Sidney Taylor Memorial Black Hat Award. The award's selection panel's guidelines describe the title of Black Hat Chef as the following: 

Hill has worked for the education and training of chefs, creating the Australian chefs' portal web site, SalonCulinaire.com, AusChef.com, Chefpedia.org, and initiating the Australian Culinary Code of Practices for Australian Commercial chefs. These codes have been adopted by every professional chefs association in Australia.

Acknowledgements

Bibliography
 (2014) Am I Chef?: Back to Basics with the "SAKE" Philosophy

Further reading

References

1942 births
Living people
Australian chefs
Australian educators